Chusquea villosa is a species of bamboo endemic to Ecuador.

References

villosa
Endemic flora of Ecuador
Grasses of South America
Vulnerable flora of South America
Taxonomy articles created by Polbot
Taxobox binomials not recognized by IUCN